Association Sportive Nancy Lorraine, commonly known as AS Nancy Lorraine, or simply Nancy, is a French association football club founded in 1967 in Nancy, Grand Est and located in Tomblaine, in the inner suburbs of Nancy. The club currently plays in the Championnat National, for the first time in the club’s history.

The club was founded in 1910 by Maurice de Vienne under the name of Union sportive Frontière, then was later renamed Association sportive Lorraine in 1928. In 1967, following the collapse of FC Nancy, the club created a professional section and as such changed its name to become Association Sportive Nancy Lorraine. The club currently plays at the stade Marcel-Picot, a 20,000 seats capacity stadium located in the town of Tomblaine, where its head office is also located. The infrastructures of the training center are located within the forest of Haye business park, in Bois-de-Haye.

The club has won 7 titles until this day: the Coupe de France (1978), the Coupe de la Ligue (2006) and five Ligue 2 champion titles (1975, 1990, 1998, 2005 and 2016). The club also has three participations in European competitions to its credit: one participation in the UEFA Cup Winners' Cup in 1979 and two participations in the UEFA Europa League in 2007 and 2008.

In December 2020, Chien Lee, PMG, Partners Path Capital and Krishen Sud acquired AS Nancy Lorraine and Chien Lee became the chairman of the board, replacing Jacques Rousselot who had been in charge since 1995 and Gauthier Ganaye became the CEO of AS Nancy.

ASNL is renowned as a club with a good training center. One of the club's most notable players is Michel Platini, the former president of UEFA. Platini began his career at the club in 1972, playing eight seasons with Nancy. He scored the only goal in the aforementioned Coupe de France final and won two French Player of the Year awards whilst playing with the club. Platini also established himself as a French international while at the club and went on to achieve numerous team and individual accolades after his departure from Nancy. He is considered to be, arguably, the club's greatest player ever and, upon entering the section of the club's official website showing Nancy's greats, a picture of a young Platini is displayed. Can also be cited great players such as Mustapha Hadji, African Ballon d'Or in 1998, his brother Youssouf Hadji, counting more than 300 matches under the colors of the club, Olivier Rouyer and Tony Vairelles. Other players have emerged or illustrated at the club, such as Tony Cascarino, Jean-Michel Moutier, Roger Lemerre, Aleksandr Zavarov, Bernard Zénier, Clément Lenglet and Michaël Cuisance.

History 

Prior to the creation of AS Nancy, the city of Nancy was host to football by FC Nancy and US Frontière. FC Nancy was formed in 1901, while US Frontière was founded in 1910. Both clubs were a part of the Ligue de Lorraine. FC Nancy continued to play football through the professional transition. The club achieved very little during its 64 years of existence only winning the second division twice in 1946 and 1958. FC Nancy did reach the final of the Coupe de France in 1953 and 1962, however, on both appearances, the club lost to Lille and Saint-Étienne, respectively. In 1965, with the club enduring financial difficulties during the 1963–64 season, mainly due to the club's being abandoned by the city's municipality and its supporters according to its president, Nancy folded shortly before the new season.

The idea of a new professional club in the city was thought of by Claude Cuny in spring 1964 based on amateur Association sportive Lorraine, formerly known as Union sportive Frontière. Cuny had previously worked with FC Nancy, but left the club prior to its destruction. Cuny is considered one of the leaders of French football mainly because of his innovative ideas and strategies. After forming Nancy, he created the first youth academy of French football. Prior to the club beginning its life as a football club, Cuny devised a strategy to immerse the club into the city's public. First, he sent out over 18,000 letters and petitions to draw interest to the team. Once the public gained notice, Cuny organised friendly matches to raise funds for the club. After accruing enough money, Cuny sought to turn the club professional, and, despite several setbacks, on 16 June 1967, Nancy were granted professional status and inserted into Division 2, the second level of French football. The club's first manager was René Pleimelding, a former French international who played for FC Nancy. Nancy, subsequently, recruited several former FC Nancy players such as Antoine Redin, as well as players from the region such as Michel Lanini, Gérard Braun and Roger Formica.

In Nancy's inaugural season of football, the club finished tenth in the league table and reached the Round of 16 in the Coupe de France. Two seasons later, the club earned promotion to Division 1 and finished in 13th place in its first season in the league. In 1972, Michel Platini arrived at the club, initially with the club's reserve team. His first full season as a player came in the 1974–75 season whilst the club was playing in the second division, having suffered relegation from Division 1 the previous season. The season was a success for both club and player: Nancy achieved its first major honour winning Division 2, while Platini appeared in 32 league matches and scored 17 goals. In the ensuing three seasons in Division 1, Nancy, led by Platini, Jean-Michel Moutier, Carlos Curbelo, Paco Rubio and Philippe Jeannol, finished in the top ten. Platini won the French Player of the Year award in two of those seasons. In 1978, Nancy achieved its highest honour to date after winning the Coupe de France. In the final, the club faced Nice and defeated its southern foes 1–0 with Platini scoring the lone goal. President Valéry Giscard d'Estaing presented Platini with the trophy to cap off the victory. Nancy's Coupe de France triumph saw the club qualify for European competition for the first time in its short history. The club participated in the 1978–79 edition of the European Cup Winners' Cup and were eliminated in the second round after losing 4–3 on aggregate to Swiss club Servette. The club played most of the season without Platini who was injured.

Platini left the club after the season, however most of the club's nucleus remained. In the team's first season without Platini, Nancy finished in 11th place. In the next three seasons, Nancy finished in the top ten. After the 1984 season, Moutier and Rubio became the last of the club's influential players to depart and Nancy suffered a free-fall finishing in the next three seasons. The implosion concluded after the 1986–87 season when Nancy finished in 19th place, thus falling back to Division 2. The only ray of sunshine for the club during this declining stint was the testimonial match held for Platini on 23 May 1988 following the players' club and international retirement. That evening, fans were treated to an exhibition that featured Platini, Pelé and Diego Maradona.

In the 1988–89 season, Nancy earned promotion back to the first division. However, the club spent the entire decade rotating between Division 1 and Division 2. The club won two second-division titles during this stint and finally earned promotion back to the first division, now called Ligue 1, for the 2005–06 season after winning Ligue 2. In Nancy's first season back in Ligue 1, the club won the Coupe de la Ligue defeating Nice 2–1 in the final. Nancy supporters arrived at the Stade de France courtesy of 11 special trains, while more than 300 buses and thousands of cars from the city also arrived in Paris. The cup victory allowed Nancy to participate in the UEFA Cup with the club eventually making it to the Round of 32 before losing to Shakhtar Donetsk. The first half of the 2007–08 season for Nancy was the club's best ever start to a season in the top division with 35 points after 19 games and sitting in second place. On 4 November 2007, in a match against Bordeaux, the club celebrated its 40th anniversary of existence with a special event involving many of the club's former players, club officials, presidents, and coaches. After a good second half start, Nancy sat in third place on the final match day of the season. However, the club finished one spot short of qualifying for the UEFA Champions League, losing 3–2 to Rennes, while fourth-placed Marseille defeated Strasbourg 4–3 to claim the spot. Nancy still managed to claim the league's best defence, alongside Nice. The 30 goals conceded equalled the club's record achieved in the 1976–77 season. After managing mid-table performances during the following 4 years at the top-flight, the club got relegated in May 2013, finishing only 2 points behind 17th place Ajaccio.

Following their relegation, the club nearly got promoted back to the first division, finishing 4th and 3 points shy behind Caen and a spot to the top-flight. Nancy remained a strong candidate for promotion during the entire 2014–15 season, but ultimately finished 5th, 6 points behind 3rd place Angers.

AS Nancy is the rival of Metz, a city in Lorraine. The match between the two teams is one of the most dangerous encounters in the French football, often classified at the highest level of risk matches because of clashes between supporters of the two camps. This match is a regional derby for the supremacy of a city.

The following year, the club still was a strong candidate for promotion. Finally, on 25 April 2016, after 3 years of absence, the club assured promotion to Ligue 1 with 3 games to spare by beating Sochaux 1–0 on match day 35. On match day 37, they beat Evian 1–0 to clinch the Ligue 2 title, their fifth second division crown after 1975, 1990, 1998 and 2005.

In December 2020, after Chien Lee, PMG, Partners Path Capital and Krishen Sud acquired AS Nancy, the club appointed Gauthier Ganaye as CEO. In May 2021, AS Nancy appointed Daniel Stendel as head coach. In September 2021, Stendel was dismissed as head coach after failing to win any of the first ten league games of the season.

Home Stadium
Opened on August 8, 1926, the Stadium originally known as the University Stadium or Essey Bridge Sports Park, was originally intended for the Lorrain University Stadium. Fully devoted to the cause of FC Nancy, Marcel Picot, a hatter installed in the 1930s in the city centre, will become president of the club and leave his name to the compound.
The complete renovation of the Marcel Picot stadium, led by the Bernt-Morillon-Thouveny agency on behalf of the Urban Community, took place between 1999 and 2003. It increased the capacity of the stadium to 20,087 seats and covered. Another expansion project is planned, bringing the stadium's capacity to 32,000 seats.

Players

Current squad

Out on loan

Reserve squad 
As of 1 February 2022.

Notable former players 
Below are the notable former players who have represented Nancy in league and international competition since the club's foundation in 1967. To appear in the section below, a player must have played in at least 100 official matches for the club.

For a complete list of Nancy players, see :Category:AS Nancy Lorraine players

 Éric Bertrand
 Frédéric Biancalani
 Stéphane Capiaux
 Bernard Caron
 Albert Cartier
 Didier Casini
 Jean-Claude Cloët
 Carlos Curbelo
 Gaston Curbelo
 Paul Fischer
 Roger Formica
 Charles Gasperini
 Franck Gava
 Bruno Germain
 Massadio Haïdara
 Vincent Hognon
 Philippe Jeannol
 Cédric Lécluse
 Éric Martin
 Sylvain Matrisciano
 Laurent Moracchini
 Youssef Moustaid
 Jean-Michel Moutier
 Pierre Neubert
 Benjamin Nicaise
 Jean Palka
 Jacky Perdrieau
 Didier Philippe
 Michel Platini
 Sébastien Puygrenier
 Éric Rabésandratana
 Jean-Pierre Raczynski
 Olivier Rambo
 Olivier Rouyer
 Paco Rubio
 Tony Vairelles
 André Luiz
 Djamel Bakar
 Tomi Ozkan
 Mustapha Hadji
 Youssef Hadji
 Monsef Zerka
 Ryszard Tarasiewicz
 Tony Cascarino
 Issiar Dia
 Pape Diakhaté
 Oleksandr Zavarov
 Pablo Correa
 Rubén Umpiérrez

Club officials 
Chairman: Chien Lee
CEO: Gauthier Ganaye
General Secretary: Pascal Rivière
Manager: Albert Cartier

Managerial history

Honours

Domestic 
Coupe de France
Winners: 1977–78
Coupe de la Ligue
Winners: 2005–06
Ligue 2
Champions (5): 1974–75, 1989–90, 1997–98, 2004–05, 2015–16
Coupe Gambardella
Runners-up: 1973–74

References

External links 
 Official website

 
AS
Association football clubs established in 1967
1967 establishments in France
Football clubs in Grand Est
Ligue 1 clubs